White Paper is a 2010 Iranian animated short film about LGBT rights and homophobia, directed by Seyed Mohsen Pourmohseni Shakib. It is director's debut short animation.

Premise 
In a monochromatic world, 6 colored children are isolated and driven out by their families for being different. Grouping together the young outcasts become a community and change their world from a bleak and persecuted world to a bright, colorful and tolerant one that accepts people of all colors.

Festivals & TV

Festivals

2010

 Student National Film Festival - Iran

2011

 FiLUMS - International LUMS Film Festival - Pakistan
 Out Film Festival - USA
 Frameline: San Francisco International LGBT Film Festival - USA
 Seoul International Youth Film Festival - South Korea
 Pikes Peak Lavender Film Festival - USA
 Eau Queer Film Festival - USA
 Sacramento International LGBT Film Festival - USA
 South Texas Underground LGBT Film Festival - USA
 Seattle Lesbian & Gay Film Festival - USA
 Roshd International Film Festival - Iran
 Reeling: Chicago International LGBT Film Festival - USA
 Soore National Short Film Festival - Iran
 Mix Brasil Film Festival - Brasil

2012

 Reelout Queer Film + Video Festival - Canada
 Zinegoak International Film Festival - Spain
 Sekanse Bidari National Film Festival - Iran
 Diversity in Animation Festival - Brasil
 Pink Apple Film Festival - Switzerland
 London Lesbian Film Festival - Canada
 Out Twin Cities Film Festival - USA
 Kashish-Mumbai International Queer Film Festival - India
 Campfire Film Festival - Australia
 The Xposed International Queer Film Festival - Germany
 Louisville LGBT Film Festival - USA
 North Carolina Gay & Lesbian Film Festival - USA
 Hamburg International Queer Film Festival - Germany 

2013

 Out in the Desert: Tucson's International LGBT Film Festival - USA 
 Malmo Queer Film Festival - Sweden 
 Torino LGBT Film Festival - Italy 
 Queer Film Festival - Identities Vienna - Asturia 
 Festival Internacional de Cine en Guadalajara - Mexico 
 48,40 Frames - Kurzfilmfestival - Austria 
 Festival Internacional de Cine, Arte y Cultura - Paraguay 

2015

 CSM International Children's Film Festival - India 

TV
 2010 - December - IRIB 4 - Iran
 2011 - July - Itzon TV - Online
 2011 - November - Shoma TV - Iran

Project
 2014 - 2 March - Art For Freedom's secretprojectrevolution by Madonna

Awards 

 2011 – Emerging Filmmaker Award: South Texas Underground LGBT Film Festival

Credits 
Producer: Seyed Mohsen Pourmohseni Shakib
Screenwriter: Seyed Mohsen Pourmohseni Shakib
Designer: Mojtaba Gheybie
Animator: Seyed Ali Sayah
Sound: Hamidreza Yasouri
Edit: Seyed Mohsen Pourmohseni Shakib

References

External links 

2010 animated films
2010 films
Iranian animated short films
2010 LGBT-related films
Iranian LGBT-related films
LGBT-related short films
2010s English-language films